"The Shadow of Your Smile" is a 1965 popular song.

The Shadow of Your Smile may also refer to:
 The Shadow of Your Smile (Astrud Gilberto album) (1965)
 The Shadow of Your Smile (Johnny Mathis album) (1966)
 The Shadow of Your Smile (Andy Williams album) (1966)
 Bobby Darin Sings The Shadow of Your Smile (1966)